Chigi may refer to:

 Chigi (dog), a crossbreed between a Welsh Corgi and a chihuahua (dog)
 House of Chigi, a Roman princely family
 Chigi (architecture), an element in Japanese architecture

See also
 Palazzo Chigi (disambiguation)